Pseuderemias erythrosticta, Boulenger's racerunner, is a species of lizard endemic to Somalia.

References

Pseuderemias
Lacertid lizards of Africa
Reptiles of Somalia
Endemic fauna of Somalia
Reptiles described in 1891
Taxa named by George Albert Boulenger